The Church of St Christopher is in Lorenzo Drive, Norris Green, Liverpool, Merseyside, England.  It is recorded in the National Heritage List for England as a designated Grade II* listed building, and is an active Anglican parish church in the diocese of Liverpool, the archdeaconry of Liverpool, and the deanery of West Derby.

History

The church was built in 1930–32, and designed by Bernard A. Miller.  In 1964 the interior was repainted, replacing the original bright and varied colours with pale Wedgwood blue and cream.

Architecture

St Christopher's is constructed in brick on a steel frame with stone dressings and has a tiled roof.  It has a cruciform plan, consisting of a four-bay nave, north and south transepts, a tower at the crossing, and a two-bay chancel, with north and south chapels.  The west portal and the main windows in the church are hyperbolic in shape.  The tower is low and contains three segmental-headed windows, and the chapels have triple round-headed windows.  Above the entrance to the south chapel is a bell-shaped bellcote.

There are more hyperbolic features inside the church, including the arches at the crossing, and in the vaulting.  The chancel arch is decorated with a relief of a dove flanked by angels.  The curved pulpit and lectern are integrated with the structures in the choir.  The font has the plan of an eight-sided star, and its sides contain mirror glass.

External features

To the east of the church are three-bay cloisters with round arches.  In the east wall of the cloisters is on open-air pulpit, which contains sculpture by Bainbridge Copnall.  Further to the east is a church hall, also in brick on a steel frame.  On each of its long walls is a plaque with the image of an angel blowing pipes by H. Tyson Smith.  Both the cloisters and the church hall are in Byzantine style.

Appraisal

The church was designated as a Grade II* listed building on 16 January 1981.  Both the description in the National Heritage List for England and Pollard and Pevsner in the Buildings of England series agree that it is Miller's most original church.

See also

Grade II* listed buildings in Merseyside

References
Notes

Citations

External links

Photograph of the exterior from GENUKI

Churches in Liverpool
Grade II* listed churches in Merseyside
Grade II* listed buildings in Liverpool
Anglican Diocese of Liverpool
Church of England church buildings in Merseyside
Churches completed in 1932
20th-century Church of England church buildings